Sir John Langham, 1st Baronet (20 April 1584 – 16 May 1671) was an English politician who sat in the House of Commons  in 1654 and 1660.

He was the eldest son of Edward Langham of Guilsborough, Northamptonshire, who he succeeded in 1607. He was apprenticed to Sir Richard Napier, a Turkey merchant, for whom he worked in the Near East.

On his return he became a Turkey merchant himself, made a considerable fortune in the City of London and became a prominent member of the Levant and East India Companies. He built up an estate in Northamptonshire which included the purchase of the Cottesbrooke estate in 1635. He was an alderman and Sheriff of London in 1642. He was committed to the Tower of London twice, with the Lord Mayor and other aldermen of London for refusing to publish an act for the abolition of royalty.

In 1654 he was elected Member of Parliament for the City of London for the First Protectorate Parliament.  In 1660, he was elected Member of Parliament for Southwark in the Convention Parliament. He was knighted on 16 May 1660 and created baronet of Cottesbrooke in the County of Northampton on 7 June 1660 in recompense for his sufferings in the royal cause.
 
Langham died at the age of 87. He had married Mary Bunce, daughter of James Bunce and was succeeded in the baronetcy by their son James.

References

1584 births
1671 deaths
Baronets in the Baronetage of England
English merchants
Sheriffs of the City of London
Prisoners in the Tower of London
People from Southwark
British East India Company people
Members of the Parliament of England for the City of London
English MPs 1654–1655
English MPs 1660
People from Cottesbrooke